RACMP may refer to:

 Real Academia de Ciencias Morales y Políticas (English: Royal Academy of Moral and Political Sciences), national academy, Spain
 Royal Australian Corps of Military Police, military unit, Australia